Mount Albert is an inner suburb of Auckland, New Zealand, which is centred on Ōwairaka / Mount Albert, a local volcanic peak which dominates the landscape. In the past Mt. Albert also referred to the 2,500 acre borough that was created in 1911 on the outskirts of Auckland City. Mt. Albert was also one of the original five wards within the Mt. Albert Borough. The suburb is located seven kilometres to the southwest of the Central Business District (CBD).

Volcano

The peak, in parkland at the southern end of the suburb, is 135 metres in height, and is one of the many extinct cones which dot the city of Auckland, all of which are part of the Auckland volcanic field.

Suburb
Mount Albert suburb was the second that developed in Auckland, after Remuera. It was mostly settled by well-off families in the late 1800s and early 1900s. Significant growth occurred between the two world wars. It is surrounded by the neighbouring suburbs of Owairaka, Sandringham, Morningside, Point Chevalier and Waterview. Its postcode is 1025.

Unitec Institute of Technology, a large tertiary educational college, is located towards the northern end of the suburb. The Mount Albert Research Centre (originally established by the DSIR) houses the Auckland centre of Plant & Food Research and other Crown Research Institutes. Fowlds Park lies in the northern area of Mount Albert.

Demographics

Mount Albert, comprising the statistical areas of Mount Albert West, Mount Albert North, Mount Albert Central, Mount Albert South and St Lukes, had a population of 15,204 at the 2018 New Zealand census, an increase of 720 people (5.0%) since the 2013 census, and an increase of 1,515 people (11.1%) since the 2006 census. There were 4,866 households, comprising 7,626 males and 7,584 females, giving a sex ratio of 1.01 males per female, with 2,877 people (18.9%) aged under 15 years, 3,741 (24.6%) aged 15 to 29, 7,107 (46.7%) aged 30 to 64, and 1,479 (9.7%) aged 65 or older.

Ethnicities were 60.3% European/Pākehā, 8.3% Māori, 8.1% Pacific peoples, 31.5% Asian, and 4.3% other ethnicities. People may identify with more than one ethnicity.

The percentage of people born overseas was 40.2, compared with 27.1% nationally.

Although some people chose not to answer the census's question about religious affiliation, 49.3% had no religion, 31.4% were Christian, 0.4% had Māori religious beliefs, 6.5% were Hindu, 3.5% were Muslim, 1.7% were Buddhist and 2.3% had other religions.

Of those at least 15 years old, 5,154 (41.8%) people had a bachelor's or higher degree, and 1,077 (8.7%) people had no formal qualifications. 2,850 people (23.1%) earned over $70,000 compared to 17.2% nationally. The employment status of those at least 15 was that 6,489 (52.6%) people were employed full-time, 1,893 (15.4%) were part-time, and 477 (3.9%) were unemployed.

Government
Mount Albert has been administered by Auckland Council since 2010, and Auckland City Council from 1989 to 2010. An early local government body was the Mount Albert Highway District Board, which was formed in 1866 and became Mount Albert Road Board in 1883. The road board became Mount Albert Borough Council in 1911, and then Mount Albert City Council in 1978. It amalgamated with Auckland City Council in a nationwide local government reorganisation in 1989.

Mount Albert has been part of the Mount Albert electorate since 1946, except for the 1996–99 term, when it was the Owairaka electorate. The electorate has been held by Jacinda Ardern of the Labour Party since 25 February 2017.

Mayors (1911–1978, Mount Albert Borough Council)
Michael John Coyle, 1911–1914
Murdoch McLean, 1914–1917
Thomas Benjamin Clay, 1917–1921
Alfred Ferdinand Bennett, 1921–1923
Leonard Edgar Rhodes, 1923–1931
Wilfred Fosberry Stilwell, 1931–1933
Raymond Ferner, 1933–1936
Henry Albert Anderson, 1936–1959
Francis Gordon Turner, 1959–1968
Frank Ryan, 1968–1978

Mayors (1978–1989, Mount Albert City Council)
Frank Ryan, 1978–1989

Notable buildings and landmarks

 Mt. Albert War Memorial Park. 773 New North Road.
 Mt. Albert War Memorial Hall. 773 New North Road. Large modernist single span shell auditorium. Built in 1960 by the citizens of the borough of Mt. Albert in memory of those who gave their lives in the service of their country. On 24 September 1989 the last civic function of the City of Mt. Albert was held which marked the final act of 122 years of autonomous local government in Mt. Albert.
 Mt. Albert community and recreation centre. 773 New North Road.
 Rocket Park. Early 1960s children's playground with metal jungle gym shapes formed like planets, stars, comets, space ships & flying saucers.
 Mount Albert Baptist Church. 732 New North Rd. Modernist church from the 1950s.
 St Mary's Catholic Church. 10 Kitenui Ave. Roman Catholic Church attendant on the adjoining churches.
 Marist School. Alberton Avenue. Roman Catholic School.
 Marist College. 31 Alberton Ave. Roman Catholic Secondary School.
 Ferndale House. 830 New North Road. A wooden Carpenter Gothic house near the main shopping area. This was built by Jonathon Tonson Garlick as a four-room cottage in 1865 and extended in 1881. His widow sold it to Mount Albert Borough Council in the 1940s. The family firm 'Tonson Garlick' manufactured furniture. The property is distinguished by several enormous Norfolk pine trees planted in the 1860s. The house is now a community venue.
 Mt Albert Methodist Church. 831 New North Road. Across the road from Ferndale is the wooden Gothic Mt Albert Methodist Church. The land for this building was donated by local resident Mr Stone.
 Mr Stone's House. 4 Alexis Avenue. Large masonry house in the Italianate style.
 Former Post Office. 911 New North Road. 1970s brick building with distinctive cylinder turrets.
 Mount Albert Railway Station. Opened in 1880, significantly upgraded 2013–16.
 Former Deluxe Cinema. 960 New North Road. 1920s building.
 Mt. Albert Presbyterian Church. 14 Mt. Albert Road.
 Alberton. 100 Mt. Albert Road. A large wooden house with distinctive turrets, was built as the residence of Allan Kerr Taylor. This two-storied wooden house has wrap-round verandahs and turrets in the Anglo-Indian style, possibly due to the family having spent time in India before coming to New Zealand. Originally this property commanded a view towards Auckland across a thousand-acre (4 km²) farm. Over the years the family sold off land for suburban development leaving only one acre around the house. Allan Kerr Taylor's wife Sophia was an outspoken advocate of the vote for women, as well as a singer, gardener and mother of 10. She ran the estate for 40 years after her husband's death, with her three unmarried daughters running it for a further 40 years, the last of whom left the house to the New Zealand Historic Places Trust in 1972. Allan Kerr Taylor had three brothers who lived in Auckland near the Tamaki River: Charles John Taylor at Glen Orchard (now St Heliers), William Innes Taylor at Glen Innes, and Richard James Taylor at Glen Dowie. The names of their properties later became the names of the suburbs. Claims of paranormal activity have been reported at the well-known homestead.
 Crown Research Institute. 120 Mt. Albert Rd. The main building is a modernist highrise block from the 1960s. (Former DSIR – Department of Scientific and Industrial Research)
 Mount Albert School. Primary School on Taylor's Road. School built in its current location in 1940 on the site of Wilson's Quarry.
 Mount Albert Grammar School. Alberton Avenue. Main building from the 1920s was designed by Walter Arthur Cumming this school is unusual for an urban facility as it has an agricultural department - this is the last open ground left from the Alberton Farmlands.
 Mt. Albert Aquatic Centre. 38 Alberton Ave, Mt. Albert.
 Winstone House. 29 Summit Drive. Late 19th century Italianate style house located on the slopes of Mt. Albert. Built for George Winstone in Upper Symonds Street and relocated here around 1910. George Winstone founded the well known Transport firm.
 Caughey House. 15 McLean Street. Distinctive house with turret. Moving to Mt. Albert in 1888, Andrew Caughey (of Smith & Caughey's Department Store) built this two storied wooden house on 4-acres of Edward Allen's land. Architect Arthur White designed a 16-room house where Caughey, his wife and seven children lived until 1923. The property is now run as part of the private school, Hebron Christian College
 Former St Helens Hospital. 28a Linwood Ave. Officially opened on 15 February 1968. One of a number of St Helens Hospitals built around New Zealand since 1905 and named by Prime Minister Rt Hon Richard J Seddon after the town of St Helens in Merseyside, England, near which he was born. The hospital closed on 12 June 1990 following a formal closing ceremony. The property was purchased by Auckland Institute of Studies in 1992, refurbished and reopened the following year as the institute's St Helens Campus.

Notable residents
Rugby player Sonny Bill Williams and actress Lucy Lawless both grew up in Mount Albert. Former Prime Minister Helen Clark, famous acoustician Sir Harold Marshall and the former TVNZ's Breakfast presenter Petra Bagust are current residents of the area.

Famous New Zealand athlete, Sir Peter Snell (triple Olympic gold medalist and world mile record holder and NZ's athlete of the 20th century), was educated in and a long-time resident of Mt. Albert as was Bryan Williams, an All Black great and president of the NZRFU.

Education
Opened in 1922, it was a single-sex boys' school until 2000, when it became co-educational.

The college was founded in 1928, and originally called Marist Sisters College, changing its name to Marist College in 2000. Marist School is a Catholic contributing primary (years 1-6) school on the same site as Marist College.

It is a Māori language-immersion school.

All these schools apart from Marist College are coeducational. Rolls are as of 

Tertiary education providers in the area include Auckland Institute of Studies and Unitec.

Sport

Association football
Mount Albert is the home of association football club Metro F.C., who compete in the Lotto Sport Italia NRFL Premier, and Mount Albert-Ponsonby, who compete in the Lotto Sport Italia NRFL Division 2.

Rugby league
Mount Albert is home to both the Marist Saints and the Mount Albert Lions, who split from Marist in 1927. Both clubs compete in the Auckland Rugby League's top division, the Fox Memorial.

Transport
Mount Albert is well served by trains and buses, and is only 7 km from Auckland's CBD. The railway station is centrally located, near the intersection of New North Road and Mt. Albert/Carrington Road. Mount Albert Railway Station is a part of the Western Line; trains run regularly into the city and the western suburbs beyond.

The centre of all the shopping and business activities in the suburb of Mt. Albert is New North Road, roughly between Richardson Road and Lloyd Avenue.

References

City of Volcanoes: A geology of Auckland - Searle, Ernest J.; revised by Mayhill, R.D.; Longman Paul, 1981. First published 1964. .
Volcanoes of Auckland: The Essential guide - Hayward, B.W., Murdoch, G., Maitland, G.; Auckland University Press, 2011.

External links

 Mt. Albert Inc for community news and information
 Mount Albert Historical Society
 Early photo of Mount Albert
 Photographs of Mount Albert held in Auckland Libraries' heritage collections.

Suburbs of Auckland